Gunnar Höglund (18 February 1923 – 16 June 1984) was a Swedish actor, film director and screenwriter. His 1964 film My Love and I was entered into the 15th Berlin International Film Festival.

Selected filmography
 Good Friends and Faithful Neighbours (1938)
 Whalers (1939)
 Her Little Majesty (1939)
 We're All Errand Boys (1941)
 Woman on Board (1941)
 Young Blood (1943)
 My Love and I (1964)
 Want So Much To Believe (1971)
  (1971, anthology film)

References

External links

1923 births
1984 deaths
Swedish male film actors
Swedish film directors
Swedish male screenwriters
Deaths from lung cancer
Deaths from cancer in Sweden
Male actors from Stockholm
20th-century Swedish male actors
20th-century Swedish screenwriters
20th-century Swedish male writers